Rossland may refer to:

Places
Rossland, British Columbia, British Columbia, Canada
Rossland City, provincial electoral district around Rossland, British Columbia (1903–1912)
Rossland (electoral district), provincial electoral district around Rossland, British Columbia (1916–1920)
Rossland-Trail, provincial electoral district around Rossland, British Columbia (1924–1963)
Rossland Range, a subrange of the Monashee Mountains of the Columbia Mountains in British Columbia, Canada
Rossland, Pennsylvania, United States
Rossland, Renfrewshire, Scotland
Rossland, Norway, a village in Alver municipality in Vestland county, Norway

Other uses
Rossland (sternwheeler), a sternwheel steamboat that ran on the Arrow Lakes in British Columbia